Gonzalo Carrasco (28 July 1935 – 27 December 2013) was a Chilean footballer. He played in six matches for the Chile national football team from 1957 to 1959. He was also part of Chile's squad for the 1957 South American Championship.

References

External links
 
 

1935 births
2013 deaths
Chilean footballers
Chile international footballers
Place of birth missing
Association football defenders
Club de Deportes Green Cross footballers